This is a list of schools in the Greater Brisbane region of Queensland, Australia. Specifically, it includes within the local government areas of City of Brisbane, City of Ipswich,  City of Logan, Moreton Bay Region, and City of Redland. Prior to 2015, the Queensland education system consisted of primary schools, which accommodated students from kindergarten to Year 7 (ages 5–13), and high schools, which accommodate students from Years 8 to 12 (ages 12–18). However, from 2015, Year 7 became the first year of high school.

State schools

State primary schools

State high schools and colleges

Other state schools 

This includes special schools (schools for disabled children) and schools for specific purposes.

Defunct state schools

Private schools

Catholic primary schools
In Queensland, Catholic primary schools are usually (but not always) linked to a parish. Prior to the 1970s, most schools were founded by religious institutes, but with the decrease in membership of these institutes, together with major reforms inside the church, lay teachers and administrators began to take over the schools, a process which was completed by the early 1990s. Brisbane Catholic Education (BCE), headquartered in Dutton Park, was established in 1993 and is responsible for coordinating administration, curriculum and policy across the Catholic school system. Preference for enrolment is given to Catholic students from the parish or local area, although non-Catholic students are admitted if room is available.

Catholic high schools and colleges

Independent primary schools

Independent high schools and colleges

Defunct private schools

See also
List of schools in Queensland
List of schools in Gold Coast, Queensland
List of schools in Sunshine Coast, Queensland
List of schools in West Moreton

References

External links
, a directory of Government schools in Queensland. (Department of Education and Training – Queensland Government)
Find a School, at Catholic Education Office of the Archdiocese of Brisbane.
About Independent schools at Independent Schools Queensland.

Brisbane
Schools